Phillips Academy may refer to: 

 Phillips Academy Andover, a boarding school located in Andover, Massachusetts and founded in 1778.
 Phillips Exeter Academy, a boarding school located in Exeter, New Hampshire and founded in 1781.